is a railway station in Nabeshima Town, Saga City, Saga Prefecture, Japan. It is operated by JR Kyushu and is on the Nagasaki Main Line. It is also used by JR Freight.

Layout

It is an above ground station with and overpass connecting two platforms (one island platform, one side platform), and three tracks.
Opposite the station building are the freight facilities.

Adjacent stations

History
On 7 July 1930, the facility was upgraded to a full station and passenger traffic commenced. With the privatization of Japanese National Railways (JNR), the successor of JGR, on 1 April 1987, control of the station passed to JR Kyushu.

Passenger statistics
In fiscal 2016, the station was used by an average of 626 passengers daily (boarding passengers only), and it ranked 217th  among the busiest stations of JR Kyushu.

References

Nagasaki Main Line
Railway stations in Saga Prefecture
Railway stations in Japan opened in 1930